Port Victoria may refer to:
 Victoria, Seychelles
 Port Victoria, South Australia
 Port Victoria, Kenya, a town in Busia County, Kenya
 Port Victoria, a coastal fort in Tarfaya south of Morocco
 Port Victoria, Kent, England
Port Victoria Marine Experimental Aircraft Depot, built a number of aircraft under the Port Victoria name
Port Victoria railway station, a former railway station in Kent, England
 Port Victoria, New Zealand, a former name for Lyttelton Harbour, part of Banks Peninsula, New Zealand
 Port Victoria, name used of the failed Port Essington colony in North Australia 1838–1849

See also
 Port of Victoria (disambiguation)